DeRoI-class locomotive was a group of Korean electric locomotives. 
There are 3 kinds different in the specification depending on manufacturers.
DeRoI-class locomotive (Mitsubishi)
DeRoI-class locomotive (Toshiba)
DeRoNi-class locomotive (Hitachi)